Anil Desai  is an Indian politician belonging to the Shiv Sena. He is a member of the Rajya Sabha, the Upper house of Indian Parliament from Maharashtra.
Anil Desai is considered to be excellent at managing elections, legal matters and back room activities. He has played a major role in managing the party’s resources and floated ideas like coining slogan, UTha Maharashtra (Wake up, Maharashtra). He is known as the party’s sober face.

In 2020, Desai promoted a Two-child policy with his the Constitution (Amendment) Bill, Desai proposed to amend the Article 47A of the Constitution of India to state -

Positions held
 2002: All India Party Secretary, Shiv Sena
 2005: General Secretary, Sthaniya Lokadhikar Samiti Mahasangh (Federation), an affiliated organization of Shiv Sena
 2012: Elected to Rajya Sabha (1st term)
 2018: Re-Elected to Rajya Sabha (2nd term)

See also
 Rajya Sabha Members

References

External links
 Shivsena official website
 http://www.elections.in/political-leaders/anil-desai.html
 Rajya Sabha MP Biodata

Shiv Sena politicians
Living people
Rajya Sabha members from Maharashtra
1957 births
Politicians from Mumbai
Marathi politicians